Tegeticula corruptrix is a moth of the family Prodoxidae. It is found in North America in south-western California, Arizona, New Mexico, northern Coahuila, western and southern Texas, Colorado, Alberta, the western plains of Nebraska, Wyoming and Montana. The habitat consists of grassland, shrub desert, rocky hillsides, open pine forests and shrubby grassland.

The forewings are white or sometimes tan colored. The hindwings are usually uniformly dark brown.

The larvae feed on Yucca baccata, Yucca treculeana, Yucca torreyi, Yucca schidigera, Yucca glauca, Yucca baileyi, Yucca elata and Yucca verdiensis. They feed on developing seeds. Pupation takes place in a cocoon in the soil.

This species was called a "cheater" by its original describer because it lays eggs in the developing seeds and fruits of yucca plants without pollinating the flowers, unlike other yucca moths.

References

Moths described in 1999
Prodoxidae